Omjerky is  a tiny island near Wad Hamid. Most of the people are farmers. They grow crops and raise  cattle and sheep. There is a primary school, a clinic and a mosque. The people are friendly and generous. In the past, Omjerky was  river port. There is Khalwat Alfaki Salim which was founded by Wad Fazari from the Jaleen tribe. Elobied Wad Badr a famous Sufi used to teach in that Khalwa.

See Omjerky in Google Maps:
https://maps.google.com/?ie=UTF8&ll=16.413527,32.778397&spn=0.077228,0.109692&z=13

Islands of Sudan